Joaquin Gerardo Gil Quesada (born May 1, 1952) is a filmmaker (producer, director, writer, editor and special-effect/animation artist) known for the creation of "animation-rich" feature films, where live actors interact on animated, usually computer-generated imagery environments. He had worked on films such as Starship Troopers, Contact and Godzilla as part of Sony Imageworks before starting the creation of his own "niche" films in the year 2000.

A graduate of the Film M.F.A. program at California Institute of the Arts (1997), Kino studied visual arts with Jules Engel, Ed Emshwiller, Vibeke Sorensen and Michael Scroggins. His Electro-acoustic Music studies were under Morton Subotnick and Mark Waldrep. He has also a degree in Social Anthropology from the Universidad de Costa Rica (1971).

His earliest recorded work occurs in Costa Rica with the Centro Costarricense de Produccion Cinematografica, where he participates in the creation of the Center's first three documentaries on bio-diversity and conservation. Gil has written and registered with WGA West (Los Angeles, California) seven screenplays for film and video, and has two unpublished Steampunk novels as of May 2010, "Gatekeeper" and "Castle Griffon", as well as numerous artistic and technical articles for film, imagery and animation themes published on print and the Web.

Mr. Gil is the director and creator of the Vasst Training DVD: "Video Editing Master Class" Editing on the Right Side of the Brain" on sale on the Internet   -  

A creator of fantasy and science fiction, Joaquin wrote, produced, directed, edited and created the animation for the feature films "Zipacna" (2006) premiered at the Egyptian Theatre in Hollywood on May 9, 2006, (in limited distribution) and "The Outsider" (2008) winner of the Best Sci-Fi Film Heart Award from the Heart of England International Film Fest 2008 and the "Festival Choice Award" from the Paso Robles Digital Film Festival 2008.

Joaquin is also very active as an artist in the field of Abstract Animation. His stark B&W piece "Mecanismo" (2007) was a selected finalist in the 2008 "Punto Y Raya" animation festival from MAD/Actions, Spain.

Personal life
Married to Giselle Calderon et  author, educator and actress Gloria Rodriguez-Gil in 1998. Daughter

References
0.  National Assn. Of Latino Independent Producers "In The Spotlight" Latinos In The Industry - NALIP.org  March 29, 2005   retrieved June 14, 2009
1.  National Assn. Of Latino Independent Producers "KINO Digital Media Presents" Latinos in the Industry - NALIP.org    Aug 29,2005  retrieved June 14, 2009 
2.  National Assn. Of Latino Independent Producers "The Latino Media Resource Guide 2006"- NALIP.org  2006 Filmmakers.pdf  pp 271  retrieved June 14, 2009
3.  Víctor Fernández G. "Un tico entre grandes: Kino Gil presenta su primer largometraje." Nacion.com  Jan 25,2007   retrieved June 14, 2009
4.  Iota Center News "Punto y Raya (Dot and Line) Festival, US Tour" IotaCenter.org  27 November 2008       retrieved June 14, 2009
5.  Punto Y Raya Festival "Awarded Artists" www.puntoyrayafestival.com  Summer 2008    retrieved June 14, 2009
6.  Alexander Sanchez C. "Un tico recrea una guerra digitalizada" - VIVA Online: nacion.com   October 4, 2008    retrieved June 14, 2009

External links
Creative COW "Creative Cow forum host: Kino Gil"   CreativeCOW.NET  2005   retrieved June 14, 2009
THE INTERNET MOVIE DATABASE "Joaquin 'Kino' Gil" imdb.com   2007  retrieved June 14, 2009
Digital Production Buzz  "What's the BuZZ? Joaquin "Kino" Gil - Founder and President .KINO.Digital"  digitalproductionbuzz.com     Sept 6, 2007   retrieved June 14, 2009

Works
 Works Website  
 3D Short "By Night"  

1952 births
Living people
American animators
American film directors
American film producers
American animated film directors
American animated film producers
American male screenwriters
California Institute of the Arts alumni
University of Costa Rica alumni